EZ Canis Majoris (abbreviated to EZ CMa, also designated as WR 6) is binary system in the constellation of Canis Major.  The primary is a Wolf-Rayet star and it is one of the ten brightest Wolf-Rayet stars, brighter than apparent magnitude 7.

Binary system

EZ CMa has an apparent visual magnitude which varies between 6.71 and 6.95 over a period of 3.766 days, along with changes in the spectrum. It has been proposed that it could be a binary star, with a neutron star as companion that would complete an orbit around the Wolf-Rayet with that period, being it the cause of those variations. The General Catalogue of Variable Stars lists it as a possible cataclysmic variable on this basis. It has been argued that the companion does not exist and spectral variations are caused by activity on the star's surface.

Observations of the light variations over a four-month period from late 2015 to early 2016 confirmed the clear  variations. This was interpreted as a  orbital period with rapid apsidal precession completing a full rotation in about 100 days.  The orbit is inclined at around 60–74 degrees and there are two eclipses during each orbit.

Wolf Rayet star and nebula
The spectral type of WN4 indicates an extremely hot star, and this leads to a very high luminosity, mostly emitted as ultraviolet radiation. The spectrum shows a star entirely devoid of hydrogen at the surface.

EZ CMa is surrounded by a faint bubble nebula, a small HII region blown by stellar winds up to 1,700 km/s and ionised by the intense UV radiation. This is catalogued as Sharpless Sh2-308, or just S308. It is likely to be a member of the very scattered open cluster Collinder 121, found around the orange supergiant ο1 CMa.

References

External links

Canis Major
Wolf–Rayet stars
050896
033165
Canis, EZ
CD-23 04553
2583
Variable stars
Eclipsing binaries